Michael Lefor is an American politician. First elected in 2014, he sits in the North Dakota House of Representatives where he serves as Majority Leader of the House Republican caucus. Prior to his election as Majority Leader, he chaired the House Industry, Business, and Labor Committee as well as the interim Retirement Committee. Lefor is also the chief executive officer of DCI Credit Services, a Dickinson, North Dakota-based collection agency.

Lefor is married to Sherryl Lefor with three children: Brett, Scott, and Andi. He is an alumnus of Dickinson State University.

References

21st-century American politicians
Dickinson State University alumni
Living people
Republican Party members of the North Dakota House of Representatives
Year of birth missing (living people)